The 1977 Calgary Stampeders finished in 5th place in the Western Conference with a 4–12 record and failed to make the playoffs.

Regular season

Season Standings

Season schedule

Awards and records

1977 CFL All-Stars
WR – Tom Forzani, CFL All-Star

References

Calgary Stampeders seasons
1977 Canadian Football League season by team